Flavius Vladimir Stoican (born 24 November 1976) is a Romanian professional football manager and former player, currently in charge of Liga I club Botoșani.

Club career
He started his football career at FC Drobeta, but soon he left them for Universitatea Craviova, where he played for seven years. In the summer of 2002, Stoican moved to Romanian giants Dinamo București.

While playing for Dinamo, Shakhtar Donetsk manager, Mircea Lucescu, spotted Stoican's abilities and brought him to the Ukrainian Premier League club in the summer of 2003. He spent four years at Shakhtar before moving to Metalist Kharkiv. He did not manage to find a place in the first team at Metalist and moved back to Dinamo București for the final year of his playing career.

International career
From 1999 to 2005, Stoican made 19 appearances for Romania, making his debut under coach Victor Pițurcă when he came as a substitute and replaced Dan Petrescu in a friendly against Cyprus which ended 2–2. He played two games at the Euro 2004 qualifiers and six at the 2006 World Cup qualifiers. Stoican's last game for the national team was a friendly against Nigeria which ended with a 3–0 victory.

International stats

Managerial career
In 2009, after ending his player career, Stoican was appointed manager of Liga III club Minerul Valea Copcii. For the 2010–11 season he moved to CSM Reșița, and in July 2011 he was appointed head coach of Dinamo II București. After only six months, he resigned from Dinamo II and took control of Chindia Târgoviște. He left Chindia in September 2012, after a poor series of results. In October 2012, Stoican became head coach at Mioveni, with the primary objective of helping the team gain promotion to Liga I.

Dinamo
In August 2013, he came back to Dinamo II, now playing in the Liga III, with the objective of gaining promotion to Liga II. On 22 September 2013, Stoican was appointed as head coach at the main squad of FC Dinamo București. His contract was terminated by mutual agreement on 12 November 2014, when the club was placed sixth in Liga I and was eliminated from the Romanian Cup. From March to May 2015, Stoican had another brief spell in charge of Dinamo.

Politehnica Iași
In the summer of 2017, after his ambitious stint at Pandurii Târgu Jiu almost saved them from relegation to Liga II, Stoican was appointed head coach at Politehnica Iași. On 24 February 2018, in spite of a 0–1 loss to defending champions Viitorul Constanța, Stoican led Politehnica Iași to its first Liga I Championship play-off and to an eventual sixth-place finish at the end of the season.

Mioveni
On 24 August 2022, Stoican was appointed head coach at Mioveni on a one-year contract. His contract was terminated by mutual agreement on 1 November 2022.

Managerial statistics

Honours

Player
Dinamo București
Cupa României: 2002–03
Shakhtar Donetsk
Ukrainian Premier League: 2004–05, 2005–06
Ukrainian Cup: 2003–04
Ukrainian Super Cup: 2005

Personal life
His daughter Lorena is a professional handball player, who currently plays for SCM Craiova.

References

External links

1976 births
Living people
People from Vânju Mare
Romanian footballers
Association football defenders
Romania international footballers
Romanian expatriate footballers
FC Drobeta-Turnu Severin players
FC Metalist Kharkiv players
FC Shakhtar Donetsk players
FC U Craiova 1948 players
FC Dinamo București players
Liga I players
Ukrainian Premier League players
Expatriate footballers in Ukraine
Romanian expatriate sportspeople in Ukraine
Romanian football managers
Liga I managers
Liga II managers
CSM Reșița managers
AFC Chindia Târgoviște managers
CS Mioveni managers
FC Dinamo București managers
FC Voluntari managers
FC Zimbru Chișinău managers
CS Pandurii Târgu Jiu managers
FC Politehnica Iași (2010) managers
FC Petrolul Ploiești managers
ACS Viitorul Târgu Jiu managers
FC U Craiova 1948 managers
FC Botoșani managers
Moldovan Super Liga managers
Romanian expatriate football managers
Expatriate football managers in Moldova
Romanian expatriate sportspeople in Moldova